Ron Hall may refer to:

 Ron Hall (tight end) (1964–2007), former professional American football player
 Ron Hall (defensive back) (born 1937), American collegiate and professional American football player
 Ron Hall (Australian footballer, born 1921) (1921–1994), former Australian rules footballer in the VFL
 Ron Hall (Australian footballer, born 1945) (1945–2014), former Australian rules footballer from Tasmania
 Ron Hall (painter) (born 1945), American painter and writer